XHESL-FM is a radio station on 102.1 FM in San Luis Potosí, San Luis Potosí, Mexico. It is owned by MG Radio and carries the Exa FM pop format.

History
XESL-AM 1340 received its concession on January 22, 1946. It was known as Radio San Luis and later as Radio Futurama. It was owned by Ceferino Z. Jiménez who also owned XECZ and XEPO.

By the late 1980s, XESL had affiliated to OIR and was running a Spanish oldies format. This changed slightly in the mid-1990s, under new ownership. In 1999, XESL became grupera-formatted Cancionera 1340, a format it held until the mid-2000s with a one-month exception in 2002, when it carried the short-lived Red W Interactiva talk network.

MG Radio took over the station in the mid-2000s and gave it another oldies format, known as Señal 1340 Golden Music. This left the air in 2010 to make way for the Romance format, moved from XHSS-FM.

On February 22, 2011, XHESL-FM 102.1 signed on, and the newly minted combo flipped to the Ke Buena national grupera format from Televisa Radio. In June 2012, this was transitioned over to the competing La Z format from OIR. The AM station signed off in 2014.

In 2016, MG Radio flipped XHESL to Exa FM as part of a new alliance between MG and MVS Radio. The format had been dropped by GlobalMedia's XHOD-FM a month prior.

References

External links
Exa FM 102.1 Facebook

Radio stations in San Luis Potosí
Radio stations established in 1946
1946 establishments in Mexico